Marita Ruoho (born 13 August 1949) is a Finnish orienteering competitor and World champion. She won a gold medal at the 1978 World Orienteering Championships in Kongsberg with the Finnish relay team. She received a silver medal in 1981 (Thun).

See also
 Finnish orienteers
 List of orienteers
 List of orienteering events

References

1949 births
Living people
Finnish orienteers
Female orienteers
Foot orienteers
World Orienteering Championships medalists